The Buddy Miles Express was a musical group fronted by American drummer/vocalist Buddy Miles. It was formed after the 1968 breakup of Miles's earlier group Electric Flag. They released four albums.

Background

1968 
The Buddy Miles Express was formed after the Electric Flag, of which Miles was a member, broke up in 1968. The group also contained four other former Electric Flag members. Billboard announced in its October 12 issue that the group had signed to Mercury Records and was to record under the direction of Lou Reizner, the head of Mercury's London operation. Miles also recruited Jim McCarty, whom he had contacted on the west coast. McCarty had been with Mitch Ryder and the Detroit Wheels. He accepted Miles' offer as he wanted to work with a band that had that "big sound" with its horn section.

In the November 16, 1968 issue of Billboard that the group to make its first appearance in New York for a benefit concert for Biafra at Bill Grahams Fillmore East. The Express were announced as the headline act.

Their debut album Expressway to Your Skull was released on Mercury SR 61196 in 1968. The liner notes for the album were written by Jimi Hendrix. The November 30 issue of Billboard picked "Train" and "Spot On The Wall" as fuel for the group's chart rise. The single for the album, "Train", was produced by Lou Reizner.

1969 
In 1969, Electric Church was released. Jimi Hendrix produced one side and Ann Tansey of Mercury Records produced the other. For the week ending June 7, 1969, their album entered the Billboard Top LPs chart at 147.

Around September 1969, Robert Fitzpatrick took legal action against the group, Mercury Records and the Ashley Famous Agency for breach of contract. He sought around $30,000 in damages and also to stop the group members from being paid until he was reimbursed.

That same year, Jim McCarty left the band and joined Cactus.

1970s 
On April 25, 1970, the group plus Ballin' Jack opened for Jimi Hendrix at The Forum in Inglewood, California. In May 1972, the group appeared at the 2nd British Rock Meeting Concert, an event which ran from May 20 to May 22. The event, which was held in Germersheim, West Germany, featured acts including Humble Pie, Pink Floyd, Atomic Rooster, Linda Lewis, Osibisa and Curved Air.

The group released their Booger Bear album in 1973. A Billboard reviewer referred to it as a production of the first order. Also mentioned was the time and care put into the material and selections. The direction was more towards commercial rock than hard blues. This album was also released in Quadraphonic SQ Matrix format. It differed from previous releases in SQ and QS in that it didn't stick to the "front of the music" format. There was more directionality in the music and voices on one song, "Louie's Blues" coming from the rear were effective. The Billboard review mentioned Columbia's engineers really opening up the spectrum. The album entered the Billboard Soul LPs chart at no 56 and remained on the chart for a week.

1980s to 1990s 
On December 27, 1984, the Buddy Miles Express played at San Francisco's Kabuki Theatre, an event sponsored by Bill Graham and Radio KRQ, with some of the proceeds going to World Vision to help Ethiopian famine refugees.

Miles reformed the Express sometime after playing with Bootsy Collins in the early 1990s.

The last album release that was credited to the Buddy Miles Express was Hell And Back, released on Rykodisc RCD 10305 in 1994.

Musicians 

 Expressway To Your Skull
 Terrence Clements ... tenor saxophone
 Marcus Doubleday  ... trumpet, flugelhorn
 Virgil Gonsalves ... baritone saxophone, soprano saxophone, flute
 Jim McCarty  ... guitar
 Bill McPherson ... tenor saxophone, soprano saxophone, flute
 Buddy Miles ... vocals, drums, guitar, organ, bass
 Bill Rich ... bass
 Herbie Rich ... organ, tenor saxophone
 Ron Woods ... drums

 Electric Church
 Peter Carter ... trumpet
 Tom Hall ... trumpet
 Duane Hitchings ... organ
 Jim McCarty ... guitar
 Buddy Miles ... vocals, drums
 Bill Rich ... bass
 Bobby Rock ... saxophone
 James Tatum ... saxophone
 Tobie Wynn ... saxophone

 Booger Bear
 Bill Atwood ... trumpet
 Jo Baker ... background vocals
 Donny Beck ... synthesiser, organ, clavinet, piano, background vocals
 Steve Busfield ... lead guitar, background vocals
 Bob Ferrara ... tenor saxophone
 Robert Hogins ... organ
 Mingo Lewis ... percussion, congas
 Buddy Miles ... lead vocals, drums, guitar, bass, background vocals
 Pat O'Hara ... trombone
 Roland Robinson ... bass, drums
 Ann Sampson ... background vocals
 Pete Welker ... trumpet

 Hell and Back
 Crispin Cioe  ... alto saxophone, baritone saxophone
 Larry Etkin  ... trumpet
 Bob Funk  ... trombone
 Arno Hecht ... tenor saxophone
 Jeff Levine ... organ, piano, clavinet
 Buddy Miles ... vocals, drums, guitar
 Nicky Skopelitis ... guitar
 Kevon Smith ... guitar
 Joe Thomas ... bass
 The Uptown Horns ... horns

Discography

Later years 
Herbie Rich and his wife Hilda who he had married in 1989 became involved in the Christian ministry. They visited large malls around Atlanta, homeless shelters, schools and nursing homes, spreading the word. He died in Mableton, Georgia on May 12, 2004, at the age of 60.

Buddy Miles died in Austin, Texas on 26 February 2008.

Virgil Gonsalves died on October 20, 2008 in Salinas, California.

References 

Musical groups established in 1968
Musical groups disestablished in 1970
American blues rock musical groups
American psychedelic rock music groups
1968 establishments in the United States
1970 disestablishments in the United States